Duhok Sports Club, founded in 1970, is a professional sports club, based in Duhok, Iraqi Kurdistan, that competes in the Iraqi Premier League, Duhok SC's biggest rivals are also their neighbours Zakho SC, always producing the most passionate and fierce matches every season, with whom they contest the Badinan Derby.

Club history
Duhok Football Club (Duhok FC) was founded by the youth of Duhok city when three teams joined together to establish the club on 14 December 1970.

Duhok football club began its football in rural leagues class until in 1974–75 the club decided to suspend its activities in order to support the post nationalistic struggle to defend the rights of Kurdish people in Iraq. In 1976, Duhok football team participated in the Iraqi third division, from 1978 the team was in second division, During the 1990–91 season the team did not participate in the league because of a major uprising. The football team resumed its participation in the 1992–93 season of the fourth division, and went up to the third division a year later. In the 1993–94 season the club participated in the third division. The club was promoted yet again this time to the second division. The 1994–95 season was a very triumphant season for Duhok SC, as they claimed the second division and qualified to the Iraqi first division in the 1995–96 season. Duhok remained in the first division during the 1996–97 season. In the 1997–98 season, Duhok SC secured promotion to the Iraqi premier league by winning the first division.
since then Duhok SC spent many years in mid-table obscurity occasionally challenging the top Iraqi sides. However all this changed after the invasion of Iraq, with this came liberation and freedom for all Kurdish sport teams and personalities who have excelled in both domestic and international competitions. Duhok Sc finally realized its full potential during the 2009–10 season, as Duhok SC won their first ever Iraqi premier league championship beating Talaba SC 1–0 to become the champions for the first time. Since then Duhok, SC became runners-up in 2011–12 season, thus qualifying to the AFC cup for the second time in its history. The last time Duhok SC played in the AFC cup in 2010–11, they reached the quarter-finals.

Official sponsors
 Asia cell 2006/2007.
 Korek Telecom 2009/2010.
 Newroz Telecom 2012/2013.
 Adidas, even though it is not a legitimate sponsor, because the club only took one of the Adidas World Cup designs 2013/2014

Stadium

Duhok Stadium is the stadium where Duhok Sport Club play their home games. It is a multiuse stadium in Duhok, Kurdistan. The stadium originally held 10,000 people, but after reconstruction it now holds 25,000 people, making it the one of the largest in Iraq. It was built in 1992. It is located on Raza Road, Duhok.

Rivalries

Duhok FC fans consider Zakho FC and Erbil SC to be their main rivals. Zakho FC are the club's traditional rivals with whom they contest the "Duhok Derby" but differing fortunes have somewhat diluted the clubs' dislike of each other, even though now Zakho FC are back in the Iraqi Premier League and the rivalry is set to continue and to be more heated than ever. Erbil SC and Duhok SC also share very heated rivalries, as the two main Kurdish teams in the Iraqi league both teams are very much still rivals, even though these clubs are bitter rivals, the number of incidents and violence has decreased incredibly now these clubs share very safe but still heated encounters. The match between the two is known as the "Iraqi Kurdistan Derby", or alternatively, the "North Iraq Derby".

Crest and nickname
The Duhok SC logo reflects a hawk on top of football, and beneath that is the Olympic logo. the words at the top of the badge are in Kurdish "یانه‌یا دهوک یا وه‌رزشی " written horizontally. and translated on the bottom to English 'Duhok Sport Club'. Duhok SC are nicknamed Mountains' Hawks (صقور الجبال).

Kits

Playing kit
Duhok's home shirts are now always yellow and blue, in 2012 Duhok Sc introduced a new home kit for the season 2012/2013, a yellow kit with sky blue hoops. Traditionally the home kit has always been yellow, the away kit would usually be blue or blue and white. Duhok SC has made the colours yellow and blue the club's prime colours.

Past Kits

|-
| valign="top" |

Current squad

Club managers

 Namat Mahmoud
 Hamid Mahmoud
 Hussain Hassan
 Ameer Abdul-Aziz
 Rasan Bunian
 Nadhim Shaker (1996–97), (2004–05)
 Hadi Mutansh
 Mohammed Tabra
 Natiq Hashim
 Faisal Aziz
 Basim Qasim (2009–10)
 Shaker Mahmoud
 Kadhim Mutashar
 Akram Salman
 Ayman Hakeem

Recent history

 From 2004/05 season, the competition changed from League system to various rounds including table and knockout rounds.
 From 2011/12 season, the competition went back to the single league system.
 From 2014/15 season, the competition returned to a system with various rounds.

Backroom staff and club officials

Boardroom positions

Honours

National
Iraqi Premier League (top tier)
Winners (1): 2009–10
Runners-up (1): 2011–12
Iraq Division One (second tier)
Winners (1): 1997–98
Iraq Division Two (third tier)
Winners (1): 1994–95

Regional
Kurdistan Premier League
Winners (1): 2006–07

International
AFC Cup: 2 appearances
2011: Quarter-finals
2013: Round of 16

Individual honours
2009 FIFA Confederations Cup
The following players have played in the FIFA Confederations Cup whilst playing for Dohuk :
 2009 – Uday Taleb

Association football clubs established in 1970
1970 establishments in Iraq
Football clubs in Dohuk
Duhok